According to the Book of Mormon, Hagoth was a Nephite ship builder who lived in or around 55 BCE. At least two of the ships he built were lost. The occupants of one ship were presumed drowned. Hagoth and his shipbuilding accomplishments are briefly described in the book of Alma in the Book of Mormon:

 5  And it came to pass that Hagoth, he being an exceedingly curious man, therefore he went forth and built him an exceedingly large ship, on the borders of the land Bountiful, by the land Desolation, and launched it forth into the west sea, by the narrow neck which led into the land northward.
   6  And behold, there were many of the Nephites who did enter therein and did sail forth with much provisions, and also many women and children; and they took their course northward. And thus ended the thirty and seventh year.
   7  And in the thirty and eighth year, this man built other ships. And the first ship did also return, and many more people did enter into it; and they also took much provisions, and set out again to the land northward.
   8  And it came to pass that they were never heard of more. And we suppose that they were drowned in the depths of the sea. And it came to pass that one other ship also did sail forth; and whither she did go we know not. (Alma 63:5-8)

Polynesian theory 
Non-scriptural sources suggest that Hagoth led an expedition, sailing into the Pacific Ocean from the Americas. Some leaders of the Church of Jesus Christ of Latter-day Saints (LDS Church) and scholars have stated that the peoples of the Pacific Islands, including Hawaii, Polynesia, and New Zealand, are descendants of the Nephite Hagoth and his followers. According to the Book of Mormon, the Nephites were descendants of Israel. Many members of the LDS Church in Polynesia have come to believe that Hagoth is their ancestor. Non-Mormon scholars largely dismiss this hypothesis, citing genetic, archaeological, and anthropological evidence which indicates that Polynesian peoples come from Maritime Southeast Asia. 

Despite general agreement among scholars that the principal ancestors of Polynesian peoples migrated from Southeast Asia, there are a few evidences of the possibility of contact with peoples in the Western Hemisphere. Sweet potatoes, which are native to South America, are a common traditional staple throughout Polynesia. The Quechua word for sweet potato is kumar, very similar to the Polynesian word kumara for the same plant. There is also DNA evidence of contact between Polynesian and South American peoples prior to European contact.

Differentiating between scriptural and apocryphal accounts of Hagoth and his ships, one LDS writer makes the following observations:

 The Book of Mormon does not equate the "west sea" with the Pacific Ocean. The Book of Mormon does not tell us that Hagoth was on board any of the ships that were lost. Scripture does not say that he captained a vessel or that he was an explorer or an adventurer, or that he led people. For all we can tell, the skilled Hagoth's main objective was to profit from the shipping industry. It is possible for peoples in various places to be related to Hagoth's people (the Nephites) without Hagoth personally making an ocean voyage. Coastal and Island hopping colonies, once associated with Nephite shipping, could have built more vessels and traveled very far. It is also important to realize that the peoples of the Pacific islands may have come from more than one direction.

One problem with considering Polynesia to be at least partly peopled by "Nephite" descendants is that the Book of Mormon itself does not insist upon the point, and there is likewise no official doctrine in the LDS Church covering it.

The New Zealand Area Conference Report, Feb 1976, states that President Spencer W. Kimball told the people of New Zealand, ”President Joseph F. Smith, the president of the Church reported, 'You brethren and sisters from New Zealand, I want you to know that you are from the people of Hagoth.' For New Zealand Saints, that was that. A prophet of the Lord had spoken.”

Also, in the dedicatory prayer for the Hamilton, New Zealand Temple, April 20, 1958, President David O. McKay said, "We express gratitude that to these fertile Islands Thou didst guide descendants of Father Lehi.".

See also
 Mormonism and Pacific Islanders
 Mormon folklore

References

Book of Mormon people
Pre-Columbian trans-oceanic contact
Mormonism and Pacific Islanders
Mormon folklore